LocoRoco 2 is a platform game developed by Japan Studio and published by Sony Computer Entertainment. It is the sequel to 2006's LocoRoco and was released for the PSP handheld game console in 2008.
A remastered version was released on the 9th of December 2017 for PlayStation 4.

Plot 
Having successfully defeated the Moja Corps, the LocoRoco settle back in their peaceful life. However, Bon Mucho, the Moja Boss, is not willing to accept defeat, so he devises a terrible song that can suck the life force out of living things, as a new attack on the LocoRoco. Armed with this fearsome song, the Moja boarded their meteorite and set off once more on a mission to conquer the LocoRoco planet. Back there, the LocoRoco finds the new MuiMui house, but right after, the meteor comes crashing down onto a Nyokki, and the Mojas start attacking again (sucking the life force out of living things, and as usual, eating LocoRoco). The LocoRoco then set off on an, even more, epic journey to restore the life force into living things and to defeat the Moja Corps.

New features 
LocoRoco 2 has many new features added from its previous game, including the ability to swim underwater, squeeze through crevices, and gain many new abilities.  Noticeable new characters in the game include Bonmucho's mother, Majolinè, the BuiBui (who were MuiMui, but got kissed by Majolinè, turning them evil and have a red color to distinguish themselves from the MuiMui), Viole, a new purple LocoRoco, and an old lady named Galanmar.

Gameplay 
Like the original LocoRoco game, the player controls are the same, as they once again play as the planet. The shoulder buttons are used to tilt the world to maneuver the LocoRoco, and pressing both of the buttons simultaneously causes the LocoRoco to jump. The single large LocoRoco can be separated by pressing the circle button or through specific points on the level, while individual LocoRoco can merge back into a single being by holding down the circle button.

Locations 
The location 'backgrounds' are seen in the first LocoRoco, except for the BuiBui Fort and the MuiMui Home. These include: The flower garden (Franzea), the big mountain (Perculoka), the ice mountain (Shamplin), the tropical island (Tropuca), the land of stars (Chapo-Wahr), the dark, spooky land (Dolangomeri), the sunny/rhythmic land, (CaloCaro), the jungle/ancient ruins (Jaojab), the large tree (Yamboona Tree), and the fungus-forest (Kelapton).

Reception 
LocoRoco 2 received "generally favorable" reviews, according to review aggregator Metacritic.

References 

2008 video games
Platform games
PlayStation Portable games
Puzzle video games
Sony Interactive Entertainment games
Video games developed in Japan
Multiplayer and single-player video games